Meet Boston Blackie is a 1941 crime film starring Chester Morris as Boston Blackie, a notorious, but honorable jewel thief. Although the character had been the hero of a number of silent films, this was the first talking picture. It proved popular enough for Columbia Pictures to produce a total of 14 B movies, all starring Morris.

The Runt was played by Charles Wagenheim; in the subsequent 13 films, George E. Stone portrayed him.

Plot
Returning to New York City from Europe, Boston Blackie (Morris) tries unsuccessfully to strike up a conversation with attractive fellow ocean liner passenger Marilyn Howard (Constance Worth). He later rescues her when she is accosted by a man. However, when he tries to follow her, he runs into his friendly nemesis, police Inspector Faraday (Richard Lane), who wants to take him in on suspicion of stealing some pearls. Knowing that Blackie's word is good (and that handcuffs are useless against him), Faraday merely confiscates his landing card.

However, when Blackie discovers the body of the man who had bothered Marilyn Howard deposited in his suite, he has to break his word and debark to clear his name. He trails Howard to the Coney Island amusement park. She has been followed by two men and is struck by a poisoned dart. Before dying, she tells him enough to send him to the Mechanical Man (Michael Rand), a midway performer whose act is pretending to be a robot or automaton. Soon after, the two killers show up to report to their boss, the Mechanical Man, forcing Blackie to flee once again.

He hijacks the car belonging to Cecilia Bradley (Rochelle Hudson), and manages to lose his pursuers after a high-speed chase. Cecilia decides to help Blackie, despite his attempts to keep her out of his troubles. They learn from a radio news broadcast that Howard was a spy.

Blackie eventually discovers that an espionage ring led by the Mechanical Man is trying to take a stolen navy bombsight out of the country. Faraday and his men follow Blackie to the midway to arrest him and prove handy in apprehending the spies. As a reward, Faraday decides to forget about the evidence linking Blackie to the theft of the pearls.

Cast
 Chester Morris as Boston Blackie
 Rochelle Hudson as Cecelia Bradley
 Richard Lane as Inspector Faraday
 Charles Wagenheim as the "Runt", Blackie's assistant
 Constance Worth as Marilyn Howard
 Jack O'Malley as Monk
 George Magrill as Georgie
 Michael Rand as Mechanical Man
 Schlitzie as Princess Bibi

References

External links
 
 
 
 
 "Meet Boston Blackie"

1941 films
American black-and-white films
1940s English-language films
American spy films
1941 crime films
Columbia Pictures films
Films directed by Robert Florey
American sequel films
American detective films
American crime films
Films set in New York City
Films shot in New York City
Boston Blackie films
1940s American films